In stability theory, hyperstability is a property of a system that requires the state vector to remain bounded if the inputs are restricted to belonging to a subset of the set of all possible inputs. 

Definition: A system is hyperstable if there are two constants  such that any state trajectory of the system satisfies the inequality:

References

See also 
 Stability theory
 BIBO stability

Stability theory